"Fiesta" is a single by The Pogues, featured on their album of 1988, If I Should Fall from Grace with God.

It was written by Jem Finer and Shane MacGowan, based on a Spanish fairground melody Finer had picked up (this melody is an appeal or lure from a sausages kiosk named "Hamburguesas Uranga (Uranga Hamburgers)" in the feasts of the city of Almería, Feria de Almería, in southern Spain). The refrain quotes "Liechtensteiner Polka" by Edmund Kötscher and Rudi Lindt.

The lyrics refer to the Spanish city of Almería, as well as former bassist Cait O'Riordan's departure from the group, and subsequent marriage to Elvis Costello. The music video was directed by popular British comedian and actor Adrian Edmondson, and filmed on the roof of Casa Batlló in Barcelona.

"Fiesta" was the last Pogues singles to make the United Kingdom Top 30, while MacGowan was with the band. The song is a live highlight, and has been included in most setlists since its release, often as the closer with whistle player Spider Stacy adding percussion by beating a beer tray against his head.

In popular culture 
 "Fiesta" has appeared in many television programmes and movies, including Patrick Sébastien's show Sébastien c'est fou, on the French television channel TF1 in the 1990s. 
 It was also used in the movie The Pirates! In an Adventure with Scientists! (2012). 
It was adopted by Celtic Football Club in the early 2000s whenever they scored a goal at their home stadium Parkhead, before it was replaced by Chelsea Dagger by The Fratellis.
 From 1994 to 1995, "Fiesta" was used in an advert for the Opel/Vauxhall Tigra.
 A brief snippet of the song was used in Harry Hill's Alien Fun Capsule.
 A brief snippet was also used on Harry Hill's Tea Time.

Covers

The Spanish band Celtas Cortos released a Spanish-language cover of "Fiesta" on their 2016 album In Crescendo.

References                 

1988 singles
The Pogues songs
Song recordings produced by Steve Lillywhite
Songs written by Jem Finer
Songs written by Shane MacGowan
1988 songs
Songs about Spain